Actinochaetopteryx aurifasciata is a species of parasitic fly in the family Tachinidae.

Distribution
Philippines.

References

Diptera of Asia
Dexiinae
Taxa named by Roger Ward Crosskey
Insects described in 1982
Insects of the Philippines